The Boy Turns Man ( / Momcheto si otiva) is a Bulgarian comedy-drama film released in 1972, directed by Lyudmil Kirkov, starring Nevena Kokanova, Philip Trifonov, Kiril Gospodinov and Sashka Bratanova.

The movie tells the story of Ran (Trifonov) and his schoolmates, the graduates at the high school in a small town. During the last days as a schoolboy, Ran thinks on the possible roads of the life while walking on the streets of his hometown as if for the last time. Three different women are involved in these moments of quest, consideration and valedictory meetings.

The film received a broad critical acclaim and turned into one of the classics of the Bulgarian cinematography. The song "People and Streets" from the soundtrack to the movie, performed by Mimi Ivanova and Boris Godjunov, became one of the most popular songs of the Bulgarian variety. A sequel, named Don't Go Away, was released in 1976 directed again by Lyudmil Kirkov.

Cast
Nevena Kokanova as Tinka (confectionery' saleswoman)
Philip Trifonov as Ran
Kiril Gospodinov as Tinka's husband 
Sashka Bratanova as Mariana (Ran' classmate)
Anton Karastoyanov as the managing editor Kamenov
Vasil Popov as the painter Atsata
Elena Raynova as the singer Neli Yordanova
Evstati Stratev as the Ran's father
Hristina Ruseva as the Ran's mother
Nikola Todev as the traffic policeman
Katya Chukova as the headmaster
Nikolay Lambrev
Mihail Botevski
Valentin Gadzhokov
Krasimir Katsarov
Georgi Minchev

References

Sources

External links
 
 The Boy Turns Man at the Bulgarian National Film Archive
 The Boy Turns Man at the Bulgarian National Television

1970s Bulgarian-language films
1972 films
1972 comedy-drama films
Films shot in Bulgaria
Bulgarian comedy-drama films
Films set in Bulgaria